The Ethiopian Communications Authority (ECA) is the part of the Ethiopian government which regulates the telecommunications and Postal sectors of Ethiopia. Its primary objective is to promote the development of high quality, efficient, reliable and affordable communications services in Ethiopia. It is also accountable to the Prime Minister; its current Director General is Engineer Balcha Reba.

See also
 Telecommunications in Ethiopia
 List of telecommunications regulatory bodies
 Botswana Communications Regulatory Authority

References

External links
Official website

Telecommunications in Ethiopia
Telecommunications regulatory authorities